The women's 1500 metre freestyle competition of the swimming events at the 2019 Pan American Games was held on 10 August 2019 at the Villa Deportiva Nacional Videna cluster.

Records
Prior to this competition, the existing World Record was as follows:

Results

Final
The final round was held on August 10.

References

Swimming at the 2019 Pan American Games
2019 in women's swimming